Nikoletta Samonas (born 5 September 1985) is a Ghanaian and Greek actress and a freelance model. She is known as Nikki Samonas in the entertainment industry and has had roles in a number of feature films. She is an alumna of both Holy Child High School and the Kwame Nkrumah University of Science and Technology.

Education
Samonas had her basic education at the DEKS (Discipline, Excellence, Kindness, Service) International School in Tema and continued to Holy Child High School for her senior high education where she studied visual arts.

She later continued her tertiary education at the Kwame Nkrumah University of Science and Technology and graduated with a Bachelor of Art in Communication Design.

Career
She worked for various TV production houses such as CharterHouse for which she hosted Rythmz, Farm House Production for which she hosted the African Movie Review Show and also hosted  Breakfast Live, a morning TV talk show at TV Africa.

Ambassadorial duties 
Nikki Samonas is Ghana’s first UNHCR Goodwill Ambassador together with Kwame Annom. She also had a role as a High Level Influencer in the UNHCR's LuQuLuQu campaign.

Event Host 

 Host of 2019 Women's Choice Awards
 Host of 2019 Golden Movie Awards Africa
 Host of 2019 Glitz Style Awards

Filmography
Don Caritas
Beyonce 1
Beyonce 2
War of Roses
Desperate Measure
Red Label
Love and Bullets
DNA Test
Potato Potahto
40 and Single
V Republic 
The Will 1
The Will 2

Award and nomination

Honors 
She was honoured by the 3G Awards 2019 in New York for her contribution to the Ghanaian movie and entertainment industry.

References

1985 births
Living people
21st-century Ghanaian actresses
Alumni of Holy Child High School, Ghana